Durak Zenan may refer to:
 Durak Zenan-e Olya
 Durak Zenan-e Sofla